Yuki Matsushita may refer to:

Yuki Matsushita (hurdler) (born 1991), Japanese hurdler
Yuki Matsushita (footballer) (born 1981), Japanese football player
Yuki Matsushita (actress) (born 1968), Japanese actress